Once You Kiss a Stranger is a 1969 American thriller film directed by Robert Sparr and written by Norman Katkov and Frank Tarloff. The film stars Paul Burke, Carol Lynley, Martha Hyer, Peter Lind Hayes, Philip Carey, Stephen McNally and Whit Bissell. The film is a loose remake of Strangers on a Train and was released by Warner Bros.-Seven Arts on November 12, 1969.

Plot
Jerry is a professional golfer. When a woman named Diana recognizes how much Jerry hates a rival player, Mike, she offers to commit murder if Jerry will do likewise for her.

The person she wants killed is Dr. Haggis, a psychiatrist who believes Diana to be dangerously disturbed and wants her institutionalized. Jerry doesn't take Diana seriously until she runs down Mike with a golf cart, then beats him to death with one of Jerry's clubs.

Threatening to give the murder weapon to the police, Diana insists that Jerry now get rid of the doctor. He doesn't know what to do, consulting estranged wife Lee while looking for a way out. The longer he delays doing Diana's murder, the angrier she gets, eventually attacking Lee.

Cast
 Paul Burke as Jerry
 Carol Lynley as Diana
 Martha Hyer as Lee
 Peter Lind Hayes as Pete
 Philip Carey as Mike
 Stephen McNally as Lt. Gavin
 Whit Bissell as Dr. Haggis
 Elaine Devry as Sharon
 Kathryn Givney as Aunt Margaret
 Jim Raymond as Johnny Parker
 George Fenneman as Announcer
 Orville Sherman as Raymond
 Maura McGiveney as Harriet Parker
 Ann Doran as Lee's Mother

See also
 List of American films of 1969

References

External links
 
 
 
 

1969 films
1969 thriller films
1960s American films
1960s English-language films
American thriller films
Films based on American thriller novels
Films based on works by Patricia Highsmith
Films directed by Robert Sparr
Films set in Los Angeles
Warner Bros. films